Lika Ceni (born 1749, Ulqin) known as Kapidan Lika Ceni, was an Albanian pirate leader.

Lika Ceni was a legendary Albanian pirate from Ulcinj, notorious for sinking a ship of pilgrims bound for Mecca. He reportedly was one of a number of barbary corsairs who helped seize the port from Venice and stayed on raiding Venetian and other merchant ships along the Dalmatian coast.

His legend has also become synonymous with the famous Lambros Katsonis (1752-1804); a Greek naval admiral of the 18th century  (born in Levadia, he joined the Orlov Revolt in 1770). As captain of the Greek fleet against the Ottoman Empire he had become a thorn in the side of the Sultan. Greeks called him Katsonis, the Italians called Lambro Cazziani, Cazzoni. Ali Kaceni, the name that history remembers him by, is said to be a derivative of Katsonis. As he was attributed with defeating Lambros, thus earning his name of Ali Kaceni; Ali, the one who slew Labro Katsonis, which is in fact exaggeration as Greek commander was defeated, but not killed. In the legend of Lambros, it said that he died in battle with the Turks in Crimea; which culminates to the legend we know about Likaceni. Due to Karalambro (Black Lambro) deeds and actions against the Ottomans, the Sultan was forced to eliminate this foe. For this act, Likaceni accepted the bounty made by the Sultan; with a reward of an official title for the one could defeat Lambro Katsonis. The legend says that Likaceni defeated Karalambro, thus given the title "Kapidan". Due to Likaceni's actions and activities in the Adriatic and Mediterranean; one of which was sinking a ship of pilgrims bound for Mecca, many Ottoman pashas and captains of the Ottoman fleet convinced the Sultan that this Albanian was a massive threat and ordered his death as well. Upon being detained in the Bosphorus, Likaceni was able to slip through an Ottoman blockade and return to his home of Ulcinj and thus his legend of bravery, fearlessness and pride succeeded in surviving through the centuries.

His descendants still allegedly survive today under the surnames Kapidani and Lazoja.

See also 
Albanian piracy

References

1749 births
18th-century Albanian people
Albanian criminals
Barbary pirates
People from Ulcinj
Year of death unknown